The Oregon Tourism Commission, which does business as Travel Oregon, is a semi-independent agency of the government of Oregon based in the state capital of Salem. The agency is run by a nine-member board appointed by the governor, and governs several programs that work to grow the state economy by promoting tourism. Governor John Kitzhaber has said, "The tourism industry generates $9.2 billion in economic impact in Oregon and supports more than 91,000 jobs". The agency was created by the Oregon Legislature in 2003, and is funded by a 1% statewide transient lodging tax.

Partners
Travel Oregon partners with the Oregon Travel Information Council, another semi-independent state agency, to provide information to travelers on Oregon's highways.

References

External links

2003 establishments in Oregon
Tourism Commission
Tourism in Oregon